Cardinal vein may refer to:

 Anterior cardinal veins, which contribute to the formation of the internal jugular veins
 Common cardinal veins
 Posterior cardinal veins